Akiva Ehrenfeld (1923 – 16 August 2012) was an Orthodox Jewish rabbi who helped establish the Kiryat Mattersdorf and Unsdorf neighborhoods of northern Jerusalem. He served as president of Kiryat Mattersdorf and president of the Chasan Sofer Institutions in the United States.

Biography
He was born in Mattersdorf, Austria to Rabbi Shmuel Ehrenfeld, then rosh yeshiva of the Mattersdorf yeshiva, and Rochel Ehrenfeld. His parents were first cousins. He was named after his parents' ancestor, Rabbi Akiva Eger. Akiva's great-grandfather, Rabbi Shmuel Ehrenfeld (the Chasan Sofer), was the eldest grandson of the Chasam Sofer. At the time of his birth, his grandfather, Rabbi Simcha Bunim Ehrenfeld, was the Rav of the city; upon his death in 1926, Rabbi Shmuel Ehrenfeld succeeded him as Rav. Akiva had a younger brother, Simcha Bunim, and five sisters.

The family fled Austria in 1938 with the Anschluss. They arrived in New York on September 13, 1938. Two months later, Akiva's father established Yeshivas Chasan Sofer on the Lower East Side.

Akiva studied in Yeshiva Torah Vodaas and later joined his father's yeshiva, Yeshivas Chasan Sofer. In 1954 he married the daughter of Rabbi Chaim Tzvi Krieger, formerly Rav of Brussels, Belgium. The couple had one son and five daughters.

Establishing Kiryat Mattersdorf

In 1958 the Mattersdorfer Rav founded the Haredi community of Kiryat Mattersdorf in northern Jerusalem in memory of the Siebengemeinden (Seven Communities) of Burgenland, Austria, which were destroyed in the Holocaust, Mattersdorf being one of them. He appointed Ehrenfeld as his representative to supervise the construction and sale of apartments. Ehrenfeld sold some of the first apartments in the neighborhood to Rabbi Chaim Pinchas Scheinberg, his family members and students, encouraging Scheinberg to relocate his yeshiva, Torah Ore, to Jerusalem from Bensonhurst, Brooklyn by offering attractive terms for apartments and land for the yeshiva at the southeast end of the neighborhood. Torah Ore opened in Kiryat Mattersdorf in 1971. Ehrenfeld also encouraged other Torah institutions to populate the community.

Among the institutions that the Mattersdorfer Rav founded were Talmud Torah Maaneh Simcha; Yeshiva Maaneh Simcha; two synagogues named Heichal Shmuel, one for nusach Ashkenaz and one for nusach Sefard; and the Neveh Simcha nursing home, named after his father. The outermost street in the neighborhood is named Maaneh Simcha after his father's Torah work.

Akiva Ehrenfeld moved to Kiryat Mattersdorf in the early 1990s and served as president of all these institutions. Akiva Ehrenfeld also founded Yeshivas Beis Shmuel, named for his father, in the mid-1980s. He established close ties with the government of Austria to obtain funding for several institutions, including a kindergarten and the Neveh Simcha nursing home. Following an official state visit to Israel by Austrian President Thomas Klestil in 1994, which included a side tour of Kiryat Mattersdorf, Klestil hosted Ehrenfeld at an official reception at the Hofburg Palace in Vienna on January 24, 1995.

Ehrenfeld declined to serve as the neighborhood's Rav. Instead, he acted as president of Kiryat Mattersdorf while his only son, Rabbi Yitzchok Yechiel Ehrenfeld, became the Rav of the neighborhood.

Death and burial
Ehrenfeld underwent surgery for an abdominal obstruction on July 16, 2012 (Tisha B'Av) but did not recover. He died on August 16, 2012 at Shaare Zedek Medical Center and was buried that night on Har HaMenuchot near the grave of his father.

References

Austrian Haredi rabbis
American Haredi rabbis
Haredi rabbis in Israel
Jewish emigrants from Austria to the United States after the Anschluss
People from Mattersburg District
Burials at Har HaMenuchot
1923 births
2012 deaths
Oberlander Jews
20th-century American rabbis
21st-century American rabbis
American emigrants to Israel